The Henry Shoemaker Farmhouse is a circa 1810 Federal style farmhouse which was involved in the Battle of South Mountain in 1862. Located near the eastern end of Turner's Gap, the house was the center of a Union encampment and served as a field hospital.

The Henry Shoemaker Farmhouse was listed on the National Register of Historic Places in 1989.

References

External links
, including photo in 2004, at Maryland Historical Trust

Federal architecture in Maryland
Houses in Frederick County, Maryland
Houses on the National Register of Historic Places in Maryland
Maryland in the American Civil War
Houses completed in 1810
American Civil War sites in Maryland
National Register of Historic Places in Frederick County, Maryland